EIJ may refer to:
 Air Efata, an Indonesian airline
 Egyptian Islamic Jihad
 Eritrean Islamic Jihad